Ela Darling is an American pornographic actress and co-founder of virtual reality company VRTube.xxx.  According to The New York Times, Darling first used virtual reality technology to record an erotic scenario in 2014.

Life and career 
Darling earned a Master of Library Science degree from the University of Illinois, and worked as a reference librarian prior to becoming an actor and entrepreneur.

Darling has been a speaker at several conferences focused on virtual reality. She was also one of the individuals profiled in Allan Amato's 2016 book Slip: Naked in Your Own Words.

In 2014, she started VRTUBE.XXX and has been considered a pioneer and an entrepreneur in the industry of Virtual Reality erotica; an industry that was projected in 2018 to grow to $1 billion (USD) by 2020.

At the 2016 South by Southwest Festival, The Guardian quoted Darling asserting that patent holders were preventing the production of teledildonic technology. In October 2017 comments Darling made about how sex robots would affect the erotic film industry were widely repeated.

In a 2017 profile of Darling, Rolling Stone magazine described Darling's first experience filming a VR experience.

Darling won the 2018 XBIZ Award for "Crossover Star of the Year".

References

External links
 
 
 

American entertainment industry businesspeople
American librarians
American women librarians
American pornographic film actresses
American women company founders
American company founders
Living people
Pornographic film actors from Texas
Virtual reality pioneers
University of Illinois alumni
Year of birth missing (living people)
21st-century American women